Tessa “Tess” Cieplucha (born 24 September 1998) is a Canadian swimmer who primarily competes in the individual medley. She is the reigning champion in the women’s 400m Individual Medley winning Gold at both 2021 Fina World Swimming Championships (25m) in Abu Dhabi, UAE, and 2019 Pan American Games in Lima, Peru.

Cieplucha is currently a Senior National Team member for Swimming Canada. She made her national team debut with Canada at the 2014 FINA World Junior Open Water Swimming Championships and swam the 1,500m freestyle. The following year at the 2015 FINA World Junior Swimming Championships where she finished 15th. She represented Canada at the 2020 Summer Olympic Games.

She currently represents the Toronto Titans part of the International Swimming League.

Career

College 
Cieplucha attended the University of Tennessee, Knoxville, where she competed for the Tennessee Volunteers Swimming and Diving team from 2016 - 2020, coached under Director of Swimming and Diving, Matt Kredich. In her final year Cieplucha was the 2020 SEC Champion in the 400y Individual Medley. She was part of the first place 800y Freestyle relay team, as well as placing fourth in both the 200y Individual Medley and 200y Butterfly events.

Cieplucha was part of the first ever University of Tennessee Lady Vols Swimming and Diving SEC Championship Team (2020).

Pan American Games 
At the 2019 Pan American Games in Lima, Peru, Cieplucha was the champion in the 400m Individual Medley, and a finalist in 200m Breaststroke, placing 7th.

Olympic Games 
Cieplucha made her Olympic debut at the 2020 Summer Olympic Games in Tokyo, Japan swimming the 400m Individual Medley. She finished in 14th place overall.

Fina World Swimming Championships 
Cieplucha became a World Champion at the 2021 Fina World Swimming Championships (25m) in Abu Dhabi, United Arab Emirates. Cieplucha won Gold in the 400m Individual Medley event. She earned a second gold medal swimming in the prelim portion of the 4 x 200m Freestyle relay that won Gold at finals. Cieplucha was also a finalist in the 200 Breaststroke event placing 6th overall.

International Swimming League 
In 2020 Cieplucha was a member of the International Swimming League, season 2, representing the Toronto Titans, an expansion team that finished seventh overall. The second season was a condensed six-week bubble held in Budapest, Hungary due to the COVID-19 pandemic. Cieplucha swam the 200m and 400m individual medley, 200m butterfly, and 400m freestyle events. Cieplucha had two wins in the 400m individual medley.

Personal 
Cieplucha is a graduate of University of Tennessee, Knoxville (2021) earning her degree, a double major in Geology & Environmental Sciences, and Geography.

References

External links
 
 
 

1998 births
Living people
Tennessee Volunteers women's swimmers
Canadian female medley swimmers
Sportspeople from Oakville, Ontario
Swimmers at the 2019 Pan American Games
Pan American Games medalists in swimming
Pan American Games gold medalists for Canada
Canadian female freestyle swimmers
Medalists at the 2019 Pan American Games
Swimmers at the 2020 Summer Olympics
Olympic swimmers of Canada
Medalists at the FINA World Swimming Championships (25 m)
Swimmers at the 2022 Commonwealth Games
Commonwealth Games competitors for Canada